Mike Brewer (born 28 August 1964) is an English car trader turned presenter of motoring television programmes. He currently presents Wheeler Dealers on the Discovery Channel with Marc "Elvis" Priestley.

Early life 
Brewer was born in 1964 in Lambeth, London, to Roger Wilks and Doreen Fitzgerald. His father Roger was the owner at one point of a Ford Popular called "Mr Popstar" , and was heavily involved in vehicle customizing, which helped Brewer discover his passion for motoring. Brewer's first car was a beige Mini 850cc.

Television career 
Brewer's television shows have included Driven on Channel 4, Deals on Wheels, Pulling Power, Wrecks to Riches, Auto Trader, Wheeler Dealers and Wheeler Dealers Trading Up. 
With the exception of Driven and Pulling Power, all these shows have subsequently aired on the Discovery Channel.

He has appeared in a series called Revved Up in which cars are modified, and presents coverage of the British Rally Championship on Sky Sports. He has presented a show called Remote Madness, in which people with remote controlled mini cars, boats, planes and helicopters compete in a multi challenge race.

In 2010, he changed direction and fronted a new Discovery Channel series Frontline Battle Machines, where he went to Afghanistan, and accompanied front line troops, showing how they use their motorised equipment. At one point his helicopter took enemy ground fire, injuring the pilot in the head and damaging a hydraulic line, forcing a landing.

Wheeler Dealers 
In October 2003, Brewer was hired by the Discovery Channel to present their new motoring show, which was to be titled Wheeler Dealers. Upon its launch, the programme was met with success, and featured Edd China as co-host and mechanic. Following changes to the show's production, China stepped down as co-host in 2017 and was replaced by Ant Anstead.

In 2013, a spin off of Wheeler Dealers was created called Wheeler Dealers - Trading Up. The show featured Brewer travelling around the world buying and selling various cars to reach a final goal of owning a supercar.

January 2020 saw the premier on the Discovery Channel of spin off series Wheeler Dealers: Dream Car. Mike Brewer and former Formula 1 mechanic Marc "Elvis" Priestly help car owners trade up their unwanted vehicles to get them the car of their dreams.

Business career 
In addition to his TV career, Brewer is still active in the car industry, opening Mike Brewer Motors in 2012. The dealership is based in Sheffield and was nominated for Autotrader dealership of the year in 2022. He has also launched the only annual awards for used car dealers in the UK.

Personal life 

Brewer has several advanced licences: a racing licence, an advanced driving licence, and a world speed licence, which allows him to compete at world speed events.

Brewer is married to his wife Michelle. They live in Warwickshire, and have one daughter.

Filmography

Television

Awards and honours 
On 25 October 2000, Brewer was in a team that set a new British 24-hour Endurance Land Speed Record in a Volvo S60 T5.

In 2004, Brewer won the Royal Television Society Midland Centre award for "Best In Vision Personality".

Bibliography 
 Mike Brewer's The Wheeler Dealer Know How!, Veloce Publishing, 2013,

References

External links
Mike Brewer Car & Motoring News
 Personal website (MikeBrewer.tv)
Mike Brewer Motors
 

English television presenters
1964 births
Living people
English businesspeople
English male journalists